The following is a list of the first college football game in each U.S. state and the District of Columbia. Games included on this list are the earliest recorded single intercollegiate football games in each member state of the United States.

References

First Game US State